Thennamaravadi is a traditional Tamil village located in Kuchchaveli Pradhesiya Sabha of the Trincomalee district. It is 73 km from Trincomalee town.

See also
List of towns in Northern Province, Sri Lanka

External links

 http://www.kuchchaveli.ds.gov.lk/index.php/en/

Populated places in Northern Province, Sri Lanka